The Citizens' Battle Against Corruption (CIBAC ) is a political organization in the Philippines, founded in 1997. It is a party-list member in the House of Representatives of the Philippines, and is dedicated towards fighting graft, corruption and cronyism in government.

From 2001 until 2007, CIBAC was represented by Emmanuel Joel Villanueva (son of Eddie Villanueva).

CIBAC opposed Philippine president Gloria Macapagal Arroyo. In the May 14, 2007 election, the party won two seats in the nationwide party-list vote.

From 2007 to 2010, CIBAC won two seats and was represented by Emmanuel Joel Villanueva and Cinchona Cruz-Gonzales.

From 2010 until 2013, CIBAC won two seats again, and was represented by Sherwin Tugna and Cinchona Cruz-Gonzales.

From 2013 until 2016, CIBAC won two seats for the third time, and was represented by Sherwin Tugna and Cinchona Cruz-Gonzales.

From 2016 until 2019, CIBAC won one seat and was represented by Sherwin Tugna.

CIBAC also played a main role in the trial of former Chief Justice Renato Corona.

Electoral performance

Representatives to the Philippine Senate
Emmanuel Joel Villanueva (2016-2021)

Representatives to the House of Representatives
 Emmanuel Joel Villanueva (2001-2010)
 Cinchona Cruz-Gonzales (2007-2016)
 Sherwin Tugna (2010-2019)
 Bro. Eddie Villanueva (2019–present)
 Domingo Rivera (2019–2022)

External links
Citizens' Battle Against Corruption website

References

Anti-corruption parties
Party-lists represented in the House of Representatives of the Philippines